The 1973–74 Iowa State Cyclones men's basketball team represented Iowa State University during the 1973–74 NCAA Division I men's basketball season. The Cyclones were coached by Maury John, who was in his third season with the Cyclones. John was diagnosed with cancer early in the season and stepped away, with Gus Guydon taking over as interim head coach. They played their home games at Hilton Coliseum in Ames, Iowa.

They finished the season 15–11, 6–8 in Big Eight play to finish in fifth place.

Roster

Schedule and results 

|-
!colspan=6 style=""|Exhibition

|-
!colspan=6 style=""|Regular Season

|-

References 

Iowa State Cyclones men's basketball seasons
Iowa State
Iowa State Cyc
Iowa State Cyc